Esther MacCallum-Stewart is a British author and academic on games and sex, sexuality and gender in gaming as well as on the narrative of games.

Biography
Esther MacCallum-Stewart attended the University of Sussex where she completed her degrees from BA to doctorate. Though her doctorate thesis was on Popular Culture and the First World War MacCallum-Stewart has gone on to become the Associate Professor of Game Studies at Staffordshire University. MacCallum-Stewart researches how narratives in games are understood by the player as well as publishing articles on sex, sexuality, and gender in games. MacCallum-Stewart works across the whole area of gaming including boardgaming, role-playing, MMOs and casual gaming. MacCallum-Stewart has written a number of books on the subject and co-written books and had chapters included.
 She has also written a number of papers on the subject.

MacCallum-Stewart is currently the Chair of British DiGRA and was responsible for hosting the BDiGRA 2018 conference. She is also heavily involved in science fiction and fantasy fan communities. She is currently the chair of the 2024 Worldcon in Glasgow and was nominated in 2017 for Hugo Award for Best Fanzine for Journey Planet. MacCallum-Stewart was responsible for the games program and events of the Worldcon in London in 2014, division head of facilitation for the Worldcon in Dublin 2019 and deputy division head for facilities for Worldcon in New Zealand 2020.

Bibliography

Books
 Ring-Bearers – Lord of the Rings Online as Intertextual Narrative, 2011
Game Love: Essays on Play and Affection, 2014
Routledge Studies in New Media and Cyberculture: Online Games, Social Narratives, 2014
Gender and Sexuality in Contemporary Popular Fantasy: Beyond boy wizards and kick-ass chicks, 2016
The Science Fiction of Iain M. Banks, 2018 
 Rerolling Boardgames: Essays on Themes, Systems, Experiences and Ideologies (Studies in Gaming), due 2020

Chapters
 The Routledge Companion to Science Fiction. Chapter: Digital Games (with Tanya Kryzwinska).
 Theater of War (with Meredith Davenport)- Chapter: "A Master's degree in Shooting Stuff"
 Dungeons and Dragons and Philosophy. (Chapter) ‘Oh God! Kill Her, Kill Her; I'm Sorry!!!’
 1001 Books You Must Read Before You Die (2012)
 The Gender and Media Reader Routledge -Chapter :‘Real Men Carry Girly Epics – Normalising Gender Bending in Online Games 
 The Edinburgh Companion to British and American Twentieth Century War Literature (ed. Piette and Rawlinson) -Chapter:‘Play up and Play the Game!’ – The Narrative of War Games.’ 
 Online Gaming in Context: The Social and Cultural Significance of Online Games - Chapter: ‘Conflict, Thought Communities and Textual Appropriation in MMORPGs’

References and sources

Year of birth missing (living people)
21st-century British women writers
Alumni of the University of Sussex
Academics of Staffordshire University
Living people